Emmert International is a specialized heavy transportation and rigging company based in Clackamas, Oregon.  Founded by Terry Emmert as a house and small building relocation company, Emmert International has grown into being a major player in the global commercial market. While the Residential Division (house relocating) is still in business, the majority of the company’s revenue is generated from the Commercial Division. Emmert International has three branches; Rhome, Texas, Danbury, Texas and the corporate branch in Clackamas, Oregon. 

Emmert International’s Commercial Division specializes in mega-load relocation via road, marine and rail. Other services include rigging and gantry crane lifts. Most commercial work falls under the category of "engineered transport" wherein each load is carried on a custom transporter.

Emmert International is distinct in that they engineer and manufacture most of their own equipment. This ability for customization has helped the company compete globally with larger firms. Notable projects include Howard Hughes' Spruce Goose Airplane, The Hubble Telescope, the 3.2 million-pound brick Fairmount Hotel, the L.A. Country Museum’s "Levitated Mass" exhibit and Fermilab's g-2 muon accelerator. Emmert International’s primary focus is on the Power, Oil Gas and Chemical, Nuclear, Mining, and Aerospace Industries.

Emmert International is a division of Emmert Industrial Corporation.

History

During the rapid urban expansion of the 1960s, Terry Emmert began purchasing homes from properties set for commercial development and relocating them to undeveloped properties he had acquired. Terry began hiring out his crew for other structure relocation projects. In 1964 Emmert International officially opened its doors as a house and small building relocation company.

To expand the business further, Emmert International designed and manufactured a revolutionary new dolly and jacking system. The new designed project, headed up by Mike Albrecht, was an enormous success propelling the company into great growth. The Emmert International dollies and jacks set the benchmark for ingenuity that the company became known for. 

In the 1990s Emmert International launched new Commercial Division with the vision of pursuing larger clients. Emmert grew considerably with company revenue growing by 2000%. During the growth period Emmert International opened two new branches in Rohme and Danbury Texas and Clackamas became the corporate headquarters.

In June 2009, a 411-ton electrical transformer made in China was delivered to a utility in New Hampshire over the Conway Scenic Railroad using a Schnabel car from Emmert International.

Equipment
Emmert International’s fleet of equipment includes unique transportation dollies rated at 35, 50, 60 and 70 tons, self propelled hydraulic platform trailers capable of moving 10,000 tons, prime movers, dolly beam transport systems, low bed trailers, 128 axle lines of Goldhofer trailers, customized over road transport systems, specialized marine loading components and customized railcars.

See also
 List of companies based in Oregon

References

External links
.

Companies based in Clackamas County, Oregon
Transportation companies of the United States
1964 establishments in Oregon
American companies established in 1964
Transportation companies based in Oregon